Calling All Stars is a 1937 British musical comedy film directed by Herbert Smith and starring Arthur Askey, Evelyn Dall and Max Bacon. The film is a revue, featuring a number of musical acts playing themselves. It was made at Beaconsfield Studios for release as a quota quickie. The film's art direction is by Norman G. Arnold.

Plot
After a set of master discs is dropped, the recording artists are gathered with each providing a portion of their composition.

Partial cast
 Arthur Askey - Waiter
 Bert Ambrose - Himself 
 Carroll Gibbons - Himself
 Evelyn Dall - Herself
 Max Bacon - Himself
 Sam Browne - Himself
 Leon Cortez and His Coster Band

References

Bibliography
 Chibnall, Steve. Quota Quickies: The British of the British 'B' Film. British Film Institute, 2007.
 Low, Rachael. Filmmaking in 1930s Britain. George Allen & Unwin, 1985.
 Wood, Linda. British Films, 1927-1939. British Film Institute, 1986.

External links

1937 films
1937 musical comedy films
British musical comedy films
Films directed by Herbert Smith
Films shot at Beaconsfield Studios
Films set in England
British black-and-white films
1930s English-language films
1930s British films